The Tour of the Grand Dukes (French: La Tournée des grands ducs) is a 1953 French musical comedy film directed by André Pellenc and starring Raymond Bussières, Denise Grey and Christian Duvaleix as well as featuring the singer Lily Fayol.

Synopsis
Gaston is in love with Brigitte, the daughter of a baroness, who teasingly tells him that she has another lover in Paris. He heads off to the capital to find and confront his rival under the pretext of trying to recruit performers for a charity gala. He is robbed on the way and ends up lost in the world of cabarets. All the other characters come looking for him.

Cast

References

Bibliography 
 Dicale, Bertrand. Louis de Funès, grimaces et gloire. Grasset, 2009.
 Powrie, Phil & Cadalanu, Marie. The French Film Musical. Bloomsbury Publishing, 2020.
 Price, David. Cancan!. Cygnus Arts, 1998.

External links
 

1950s French-language films
1953 films
1953 musical comedy films
French musical comedy films
Films set in Paris
French black-and-white films
1950s French films